The Shetland duck is a breed of domestic duck originating in the Shetland Islands of Scotland. It is critically endangered.

History 

The Shetland duck is thought to have evolved from the Pomeranian or Swedish Blue, due to its similar appearance. It is thought that the Vikings brought the Shetland to the British Isles

Characteristics 

The Shetland is a small, hardy breed; it is active and forages well. It is essentially a smaller version of the Swedish Blue, but with black plumage where the Swedish has blue; the black has glossy green and blue lights in it. The birds usually have a white bib, and may have some white on the head; they may become paler as they age, in some cases turning almost entirely white. The bill and legs are black in the duck: in the drake, the legs may carry some orange, and the bill may be tinged with yellow.

Use 

The Shetland is a good layer; the eggs are of a good size and range in colour from white to grey.

See also
 List of duck breeds
 Shetland animal breeds

References 

Duck breeds
Shetland animal breeds
Conservation Priority Breeds of the Livestock Conservancy